The Brooks Bombers are a Western Canadian Baseball League team based in Brooks, Alberta, Canada, that began play in May 2016. They currently play at Elks Field at the Quad Ball Diamond Complex.

History
The team was first known as the Red Deer Generals of the Western Major Baseball League, and ceased operations in 2005. The franchise was then relocated in fall 2015 to Brooks.

The team's first coaching staff was unveiled in December 2015. Ehren Moreno was named the head coach. He was an assistant coach at Texas Southern University. Former Milwaukee Brewers player Kyle Dhanani was named an assistant coach. Tyler Seibert was named bench coach.

References

Baseball teams in Alberta
Brooks, Alberta
2015 establishments in Alberta
Baseball teams established in 2015